Thomas Peck (born April 4, 1953) is an American professional stock car racing driver. He is a former competitor in the NASCAR Busch Series. He is the uncle of current driver Todd Peck.

Career
Born in McConnellsburg, Pennsylvania, Peck drove the #89 Pontiac in two races in 1984 in the Busch Grand National Series, but failed to finish either race.  In 1988 he ran the #96 Thomas Chevy sponsored Olds in 6 races with a best finish of 9th at Dover.

The next year he piloted the #96 again in 28 races and posted 7 top tens and was 10th in points.  In 1990 he made 31 starts and had 12 top tens and finished a career best 5th in the points.  The next year he got 1 more top ten but fell in the points to 9th.  In 1992 he switched to the #19 Levin Racing Olds with 7 top tens.

After the third race of the 1993 season Peck was third in the point standings with S-K Hand Tools and Delco Remy sponsoring the #19 car. A series of accidents mid-season ended any hopes he had of a top 5 points finish. Tom would end the 1993 season with his 2nd consecutive 13th-place points finish.  In 1994, he got hired  to drive #31 Channellock Chevy which Steve Grissom won the championship with the previous year. This was the dream ride Peck had been waiting for and set his sights on winning the 1994 Busch Series Championship. This opportunity only lasted a couple months as before the race at Rougemont Peck was released from his ride. The next year he made his final 3 career starts in the #18 Ford and #67 Chevy.

Peck's final appearance in the Busch Series was at Nazareth Speedway in 1996, where he qualified the No. 64 Chevrolet for Shoemaker Racing's regular driver, Dick Trickle, Trickle being at Charlotte Motor Speedway for the 1996 Winston Select. He qualified the car 29th, and was replaced by Trickle for the race; Peck has not competed in NASCAR competition since.

Motorsports career results

NASCAR
(key) (Bold – Pole position awarded by qualifying time. Italics – Pole position earned by points standings or practice time. * – Most laps led.)

Busch Series

References

External links
 

Living people
1953 births
People from Fulton County, Pennsylvania
Racing drivers from Pennsylvania
NASCAR drivers